St Catherine's  GAA is a Gaelic Athletic Association club located in Ballynoe in County Cork, Ireland. The club caters for players at all age levels in hurling, Gaelic football, camogie and ladies football. The club is a member of Imokilly division of Cork.

Honours
 Cork Senior Camogie Championship Winners (1) 2009
 Cork Under-21 B Hurling Championship Winners (1) 2011 
 Cork Premier Intermediate Hurling Championship Winners (1) 2004
 Cork Intermediate Hurling Championship Winners (1) 1994
 Cork Junior Hurling Championship Winners (2) 1983, 2017 Runners-Up (1) 1981
 East Cork Junior A Hurling Championship Winners (3) 1957, 1981, 1983  Runners-Up (6) 1955, 1956, 1960, 1977, 1980, 2016

Notable players
 Cathal Casey
 Johnny Sheehan
 Denis Walsh

References

External links
Cork GAA site
St Catherine's GAA site

Gaelic games clubs in County Cork
Hurling clubs in County Cork
Gaelic football clubs in County Cork